China’s coastline covers approximately 14,500 km (around 9,010 mi) from the Bohai gulf in the north to the Gulf of Tonkin in the south. Most of the northern half is low lying, although some of the mountains and hills of Northeast China and the Shandong Peninsula extend to the coast. The southern half is more irregular. In Zhejiang and Fujian provinces, for example, much of the coast is rocky and steep. South of this area the coast becomes less rugged: Low mountains and hills extend more gradually to the coast, and small river deltas are common.

China’s coasts are on the Yellow Sea, East China Sea and South China Sea. China claims a 12-nautical-mile territorial sea, a 24-nautical-mile contiguous zone, a 200-nautical-mile exclusive economic zone, and a 200-nautical-mile continental shelf or the distance to the edge of the continental shelf.

Seas
Yellow Sea
East China Sea
South China Sea

Straits
Bohai Strait (渤海海峡)
Taiwan Strait
Qiongzhou Strait

Islands
Islands of China

Bays

 Bohai Bay
 Bohai Sea
 Dalian Bay
 Daya Bay
 Haitang Bay
 Hangzhou Bay
 Hong Kong bays
 Jiaozhou Bay
 Korea Bay
 Laizhou Bay
 Liaodong Bay
 Sanya Bay
 Yalong Bay
 Yellow River Delta and Bohai Sea

Peninsulas
Dapeng Peninsula
Leizhou Peninsula
Liaodong Peninsula
Macau Peninsula
Shandong Peninsula
Tashi Dor

Places

Liaoning
Dalian
Dandong
Jinzhou

Hebei
Qinhuangdao

Tianjin
Tianjin

Shandong
Yantai
Qingdao

Shanghai
Shanghai

Zhejiang
Hangzhou
Ningbo
Wenzhou

Fujian
Fuzhou
Putian
Xiamen

Guangdong
Chaozhou

Hong Kong
Hong Kong

Macau
Macau

Guangxi
Zhangjiang
Beihai
Qinzhou

Hainan
Haikou
Wenchang
Qionghai
Wanning
Donglang

Ports
Ports of China

Pollution
A total of 145,000 square kilometers of shallow waters along China's vast coast failed to meet national quality standards for clean oceanic water, of which 29,000 square kilometers of seawater were seriously polluted. These severely polluted water areas included East Liaoning, Bohai and Hangzhou bays, and the estuaries of Yellow, Yangtze and Zhujiang rivers, as well as inshore areas of major coastal cities. Content of major pollutants, such as inorganic nitrogen and phosphate, remains high in contaminated seawater. During the past 50 years, the inshore ecosystem had seen 50 percent of coastal wetlands disappear in excessive reclamation and 80 percent of coral reefs and mangroves destroyed.

See also
List of countries by length of coastline
Geography of the People's Republic of China
List of national parks of the People's Republic of China
Protected areas of the People's Republic of China
List of UNESCO Biosphere Reserves in China
Early Chinese cartography

External links
China Coastal Research Network
Coastal map of China
 On Fractal Dimensions of China's Coastlines 

 01
Coasts of the Pacific Ocean